Harrie Lavreysen (born 14 March 1997) is a Dutch track cyclist who competes in sprint events. He is two-time Olympic gold medalist, having won the sprint and team sprint event at the 2020 Summer Olympics. Lavreysen also competed at the 2016 UEC European Track Championships in the team sprint event. He has won ten world championship titles, including four titles in the team sprint (2018-2021), three in the individual sprint (2019-2021), as well three in the keirin (2020-2022).

Major championship results

References

External links
 
 
 
 
 
 
 

1997 births
Living people
Dutch male cyclists
Dutch track cyclists
UCI Track Cycling World Champions (men)
Dutch cyclists at the UCI Track Cycling World Championships
European Championships (multi-sport event) gold medalists
Olympic cyclists of the Netherlands
Olympic medalists in cycling
Olympic gold medalists for the Netherlands
Olympic bronze medalists for the Netherlands
Cyclists at the 2020 Summer Olympics
Medalists at the 2020 Summer Olympics
European Games medalists in cycling
European Games gold medalists for the Netherlands
European Games silver medalists for the Netherlands
Cyclists at the 2019 European Games
People from Bergeijk
Cyclists from North Brabant
21st-century Dutch people